Lenyrhova is a genus of moths in the family Sesiidae which is known from eastern Madagascar.

It is a monotypic genus and its only known species is Lenyrhova heckmanniae, which has a wingspan of 47mm and a body length of 26mm.

References

Sesiidae
Moths of Madagascar
Moths of Africa